Devon Sproule (born 23 April 1982) is a folk and indie rock singer-songwriter and musician based in Charlottesville, Virginia. She shared the ASCAP Foundation Sammy Cahn Award for 2009 with Oren Lavie. She is married to fellow musician, and music producer, Paul Curreri.

After birth of their daughter in 2016, Sproule returned to touring with the release of The Gold String in early 2017.

Early life
Born to hippie parents on a commune named Dandelion in Kingston, Ontario, Sproule claims citizenship of both Canada and the United States. Her parents were both musicians. Asked about how the experience has affected her musical career, she said:

After moving between private, public and home schooling, she eventually left high school, recorded her first record, and began touring nationally – all before the age of eighteen.

Career 
By 25, Sproule had already released four albums, drawing from influences as diverse as Frank Zappa, Bikini Kill, and a range of Canadian folk music.

A year after releasing her debut album Devon in 1999, she attracted the attention of fellow Charlottesville resident Dave Matthews who offered her a spot on a tour with the Dave Matthews Band. Bassist Stefan Lessard produced her next album Long Sleeve Story in 2001. The release of Upstate Songs in 2003 coincided with a move to upstate New York. The edgier sound, with a more folk-driven feel, represented a departure – and helped her gain national prominence.

Upstate Songs was critically acclaimed with Rolling Stone Magazine naming it to their Critics Top Albums of 2003. Julie Gerstein called the record, "perhaps the sweetest and most honest folk-pop album recorded this year," and added, "Sproule's vocal and lyrical beauty is unmatched."

At a show in Charlottesville, fellow musician Paul Curreri jumped on stage with her and joined in singing. They married in 2005 and often performed together locally. They also tour together across the United States and United Kingdom. They were regular favorites at the now-defunct Gravity Lounge, a major platform for new talent in their hometown. Curreri often "sings, plays, mixes, and produces" his wife's recordings.

In September 2011 Sproule and Curreri moved to Berlin, Germany, citing professional and economic reasons. "It felt like a good career move, to not just grow careers, but to make money, which is hard when you're going back and forth," says Sproule. "It's really fun to play over there where you can play the folk shows, but you can also play a little theater of 20-year-olds who are sitting on the floor and they're blogging about it the next day."

After living in Austin for a time, they've returned to Charlottesville. As Sproule says, "Everything that led away from Virginia felt necessary, and so did the coming home."

Recordings

She released her first album when she was 16.  Her second album, Long Sleeve Story, was released in 2001 with praise from The Village Voice.  Upstate Songs, released in 2003, made it in Rolling Stone's Critics Top Albums of the year, followed by Keep Your Silver Shined in March 2007. She and Paul Curreri performed two tracks from the album, Old Virginia Block and Stop By Anytime, on the BBC's renowned Later With Jools Holland show in 2007.

¡Don't Hurry for Heaven! was released in April 2009. Live in London, recorded with a collection of musicians including English pedal steel player BJ Cole, was released in 2010. I Love You Go Easy was released on Tin Angel Records in 2011 to further critical acclaim, accompanied by the single Now's the Time. It features a cover of Terre Roche's Runs in the Family.

In the spring of 2013, Devon went into the studio in Toronto to record an album of songs co-written with Canadian singer-songwriter Mike O'Neill. A video for the song You Can't Help It was released in the summer and the resulting record, Colours, was released in September 2013. Musicians featuring on the record include Thom Gill and Robin Dann.

Sproule announced her return to touring, after birth of her daughter in 2016, with The Gold String, released 24 March 2017. The LP contains "North American music with weirdo roots" and was recorded in three Canadian provinces — Yukon, Ontario, and Nova Scotia — and the Shetland Islands. It features backing from "Toronto dream-poppers" Bernice and Sproule's husband Paul Curreri. The idea for the album began with a stay in remote the Shetland islands off Scotland "when she first started following a thread."

As Jane Dunlap Sathe of The Daily Progress stated:

"The Gold String" started as a song and then the concept developed into an album.

Tours and festivals 

Sproule began touring nationally she was eighteen with the Dave Matthews Band. She tours across the United States, Canada, and United Kingdom regularly – often with her husband Paul Curreri. In 2011 Sproule performed at the Bergenfest in Norway and the Canada Day festival in Trafalgar Square, London. She has appeared at numerous other music festivals in her career.

Style and sound
Sproule's music shares elements of indie, folk, country, and jazz.

Instrument 
Sproule performs on a 1954 Gibson ES-125.

Personal 
Sproule married musician, singer-songwriter, and music producer Paul Curreri in 2005. They live together in Charlottesville. Their daughter Ray Lee Curreri was born in August 2016.

Discography
Devon (1999) on Three Word Records.
Long Sleeve Story (2001) on Three Word Records.
Upstate Songs (2003) on City Salvage Records.
Keep Your Silver Shined (2007) on Waterbug Records.
Don't Hurry for Heaven (2009) on Tin Angel Records.
Live in London (2010) on Tin Angel Records.
I Love You, Go Easy (2011) on Tin Angel Records.
Colours (2013) with Mike O'Neill on Tin Angel Records.
The Gold String (2017) on Tin Angel Records.

Distinctions and awards

Upstate Songs (City Salvage Records) was included in Rolling Stone's Critics Top Albums of 2003.
 Her future husband, singer-songwriter Paul Curreri dedicated his 2003 Songs for Devon Sproule CD on Tin Angel / City Salvage to her.
Best Solo Music Act "Sweet, breathy vocals; a fetching, gentle stage presence; local roots with a capital 'L'; talent that just won't quit. You love Belmont-based songstress Devon Sproule the best, but with the success of her second record, Keep Your Silver Shined (she calls it her "getting married" album), she sure does travel a lot, so keep your calendars shined for her next local gig." — Best of C-Ville 2007.
She taught songwriting at the Third Annual NewSong Academy in August 2007 Shepherdstown, West Virginia.
 She was nominated in the Emerging Artist category of the third annual Folk Alliance awards show broadcast 20 February 2008 from Memphis, Tennessee (simulcast on XM).
 She was one of six 2008 Grassy Hill Kerrville New Folk winning songwriters picked from 32 finalists who performed during the 2008 Grassy Hill Kerrville New Folk Concerts 24 & 25 May.
She shared the prestigious ASCAP Foundation Sammy Cahn Award for 2009 with Oren Lavie.  She joins previous winners John Mayer, Josh Ritter, Lori McKenna, Nicole Atkins, and John Francis.

References

External links

 Official Website Devon Sproule.
 Waterbug Records Devon Sproule recordings.

1982 births
Living people
American women composers
American women singer-songwriters
American folk guitarists
American folk singers
American people of Canadian descent
Canadian people of Irish descent
Guitarists from Virginia
Musicians from Charlottesville, Virginia
Musicians from Kingston, Ontario
Singer-songwriters from Virginia
21st-century American composers
21st-century American women singers
21st-century American guitarists
Waterbug Records artists
21st-century women composers
21st-century American singers
21st-century American women guitarists
Black Hen Music artists